Finspång Castle is situated in Finspång, the province of Östergötland, Sweden. Work on the castle was begun in 1666, by Louis De Geer (1587–1652). It is designed in the Architecture of the Netherlands Classicist style by Dutch architect Adriaan Dortsman.

Notable people 
 Louis Gerhard De Geer (1818–1896) a Swedish statesman and writer; 1st Prime Minister of Sweden.

References

Castles in Östergötland County